Svaland is a village in Birkenes municipality in Agder county, Norway. A very popular activity in Svaland is to hunt.

References

Villages in Agder
Birkenes